Carpow is a diffuse hamlet in Perth and Kinross, Scotland. It is situated immediately to the east of the confluence of the River Tay and River Earn, 2 km north east of Abernethy.

Etymology 
The name Carpow is of Pictish origin. The first element is *cair, meaning "fort, castle", and the second is *pol, meaning "(sluggish) burn" (c.f. Welsh caer-pwll).

Archaeology
Carpow is most notable for its archaeological remains. Mesolithic hunter-gatherers  arrived in the area more than 8,000 years ago. Nearby Neolithic standing stones and circles followed the introduction of farming from about 4,000 BC, and a remarkably well preserved Bronze Age log boat dated to around 1,000 BC was found in the mudflats of the River Tay at Carpow.

During Roman times the settlement was the site of a camp and fort, which was made of stone, signalling the intent to stay for an extended period. An early medieval Picto-Scottish cross fragment once formed part the lintel of a well at Carpow House.

Roman fort

The Roman fort of Carpow was a Roman fortress situated at the confluence of the rivers Tay and Earn. The fortress is known to have been occupied from the late second century AD until the early third century AD. The site of the fort has not been comprehensively excavated but it is believed to have served as a naval supply depot for Roman forces in the central lowlands. Its occupation also coincided with the campaigns of Septimius Severus in the area.

References

External links
Carpow Roman Fort

See also
Abernethy
Perth

Villages in Perth and Kinross
Archaeological sites in Perth and Kinross